The Gunner is a 1928 crime novel by the British writer Edgar Wallace.

Film adaptation
In 1962 it was turned into the film Solo for Sparrow, directed by Gordon Flemyng as part of a long-running series of Wallace films made at Merton Park Studios.

References

Bibliography
 Goble, Alan. The Complete Index to Literary Sources in Film. Walter de Gruyter, 1999.

1928 British novels
Novels by Edgar Wallace
British crime novels
British novels adapted into films
John Long Ltd books